Sainte-Lucie-des-Laurentides is a municipality in the Laurentides region of Quebec, Canada, part of the Les Laurentides Regional County Municipality.

Geography
Mount Kaaikop is located in the territory of the municipality.

Demographics
Population trend:
 Population in 2021: 1445 (2006 to 2011 population change: 15%)
 Population in 2016: 1256 
 Population in 2011: 1269 
 Population in 2006: 1138
 Population in 2001: 923
 Population in 1996: 999
 Population in 1991: 891

Private dwellings occupied by usual residents: 688 (total dwellings: 953)

Mother tongue:
 English as first language: 3.2%
 French as first language: 93.3%
 English and French as first language: 1.4%
 Other as first language: 1.8%

Education

Sainte Agathe Academy (of the Sir Wilfrid Laurier School Board) in Sainte-Agathe-des-Monts serves English-speaking students in this community for both elementary and secondary levels.

References

External links

Incorporated places in Laurentides
Municipalities in Quebec